Route 309 is a Connecticut state highway in the northwestern Hartford suburbs running from Canton to Simsbury.

Route description
Route 309 begins at an intersection with Route 179 in North Canton and heads southeast into Simsbury.  In Simsbury, it curves southeast and east to end at an intersection with Route 167.

History
North Canton Road and West Simsbury Road was established as SR 909 in 1962 as part of the Route Reclassification Act. The following year, SR 909 became a signed route, with the designation Route 309.

Junction list

References

External links

309
Transportation in Hartford County, Connecticut